Events from the year 1697 in the Kingdom of Scotland.

Incumbents 
 Monarch – William II
 Secretary of State – John Murray, Earl of Tullibardine, jointly with James Ogilvy, 4th Earl of Findlater

Law officers 
 Lord Advocate – Sir James Stewart
 Solicitor General for Scotland – Sir Patrick Hume

Judiciary 
 Lord President of the Court of Session – vacant??
 Lord Justice General – Lord Lothian
 Lord Justice Clerk – Lord Ormiston

Events 
 8 January – student Thomas Aikenhead becomes the last person in Great Britain to be executed for blasphemy when he is hanged outside Edinburgh.
 10 June – the last mass execution for witchcraft in western Europe when five Paisley witches are hanged and then burned.
 Famine in the Borders leads to continued Scottish Presbyterian migration from Scotland to Ulster.
  Icelandic-Norwegian historian and professor Th. Torfæus (Þormóður Torfason), publishes his work on the Orkney Islands, Orknøerne.

Births 
 23 January – James Fisher, a founder of the Secession church (died 1775)
 5 February – William Smellie, obstetrician (died 1763)
 19 September – Alexander Monro, physician and founder of Edinburgh Medical School (died 1767)
 23 September – Andrew Plummer, physician and chemist (died 1756)
 2 November – James Douglas, 3rd Marquess of Queensberry, nobleman, described as 'violently insane'; slaughters, roasts and eats a scullion when just ten years old (died 1715)
 date unknown – Charles Hamilton, Lord Binning, nobleman, politician and poet (died 1732)

Deaths 
 8 January – Thomas Aikenhead, student and last person in Great Britain executed for blasphemy (born 1676)
 11 August – John Hay, 1st Marquess of Tweeddale, Lord Chancellor of Scotland (1692–96) (born 1625)
 date unknown – Alexander Gordon, Royalist and pioneer in British North America (born 1635)

The arts
 A Collection of several Poems and Verses composed upon various occasions by William Cleland is published posthumously.

See also 
 Timeline of Scottish history

References 

 
Years of the 17th century in Scotland
1690s in Scotland